Gabriel Joaquim dos Santos (1892–1985) was a Brazilian salt worker and son of a former slave who rose to prominence as a self-taught architect and outsider artist. He began building the House of the Flower in 1923. Described as an “intuitive baroque” or Art Brut style of building, dos Santos constructed and decorated the house throughout the decades of his life, only ceasing when he died. To build and ornament the house, dos Santos gathered scraps and bits of trash - ceramic, china, tile fragments, broken lamps, knickknacks, shells, chains, fenders, headlights, splintered windows, smashed bottles, broken dishes, bits of old iron, chair legs, wheels, and metal lids - from nearby Cabo Frío. His hands, which appeared to have no purpose, were used to create sculptures, duplicates, and mosaics that were incorporated into the home. "Every tiny shard," dos Santos said, "turns into a thing of beauty."

Poor, black, and lacking in formal education and even literacy until he was almost 40 years old, dos Santos created work in a style entirely his own carried by fantasy and imagination. After his death, the House of the Flower was listed as part of the state's cultural heritage by Inepac, the State Institute of Cultural Heritage. Visitors and art critics consider it a unique expression of spontaneous popular architecture. Gabriel defined it as “a house made of shards and made into a flower”. His work has inspired seminars on architecture, publications, and documentaries, such as O Fio da Memória, by acclaimed Brazilian filmmaker Eduardo Coutinho.

References

1892 births
1985 deaths
20th-century Brazilian people
Brazilian architects